Adrien Kela (born 23 July 1991) is a New Caledonian middle distance athlete whose main event is the 800 metres. Kela currently holds two of New Caledonia's national records (800m and 1000m). In 2011 Adrien competed in the 2011 Pacific Games receiving two first places in the 800 metres and the 1500 metres events.

International competitions

Personal bests

References

External links

1991 births
Living people
New Caledonian male middle-distance runners